The women's 10 metre air pistol competition at the 2000 Summer Olympics was held on 17 September. Tao Luna equalled the Olympic record of 390 points in the qualification round, and won 1.7 points ahead of Jasna Šekarić. The host nation won the bronze medal through Annemarie Forder.

Records
Prior to this competition, the existing World and Olympic records were as follows.

Qualification round

DNF Did not finish – EOR Equalled Olympic record – Q Qualified for final

Final

References

Sources

Shooting at the 2000 Summer Olympics
Olymp
Women's events at the 2000 Summer Olympics